Chibhali or Chibali may refer to:
 inhabitants of the former princely state of Chibhal in Kashmir
 Chibhali dialect, spoken in the region